Centromere protein J is a protein that in humans is encoded by the CENPJ gene. It is also known as centrosomal P4.1-associated protein (CPAP). During cell division, this protein plays a structural role in the maintenance of centrosome integrity and normal spindle morphology, and it is involved in microtubule disassembly at the centrosome. This protein can function as a transcriptional coactivator in the Stat5 signaling pathway and also as a coactivator of NF-kappaB-mediated transcription, likely via its interaction with the coactivator p300/CREB-binding protein.

The Drosophila ortholog, sas-4, has been shown to be a scaffold for a cytoplasmic complex of Cnn, Asl, CP-190, tubulin and D-PLP (similar to the human proteins PCNT and AKAP9). These complexes are then anchored at the centriole to begin formation of the centrosome.

Model organisms

Model organisms have been used in the study of CENPJ function. A conditional knockout mouse line, called Cenpjtm1a(EUCOMM)Wtsi was generated as part of the International Knockout Mouse Consortium program—a high-throughput mutagenesis project to generate and distribute animal models of disease to interested scientists.

Male and female animals underwent a standardized phenotypic screen to determine the effects of deletion. Twenty five tests were carried out on mutant mice and thirteen significant abnormalities were observed. Homozygous mutants were subviable, had a decreased body weight, abnormal open field, body composition, X-ray imaging, peripheral blood lymphocytes and indirect calorimetry parameters, abnormal head, genitalia and tail morphology, an impaired glucose tolerance, hypoalbuminemia, a 1.5 fold increase in micronuclei, a reduction in dentate gyrus length and abnormal corneal epithelium and endothelium.

A more detailed analysis revealed this mutant to model a number of aspects of Seckel syndrome (type 4). The authors concluded that, "increased cell death due to mitotic failure during embryonic development is likely to contribute to the proportionate dwarfism" that is characteristic of the disorder.

Clinical significance 
Mutations in CENPJ are associated with Seckel syndrome type 4 and primary autosomal recessive microcephaly, a disorder characterized by severely reduced brain size and intellectual disability. Interestingly, CENPJ interacts with other microcephaly aossciated proteins such as WDR62 and both coordinate a regulatory function neocortical development and brain growth.

Interactions 

CENPJ has been shown to interact with EPB41.

See also 

 CENPE
 CENPF
 CENPT

References

Further reading

External links
 
 

Genes mutated in mice